Antofagasta is a port city in northern Chile, about  north of Santiago.  It is the capital of Antofagasta Province and Antofagasta Region.  According to the 2015 census, the city has a population of 402,669.

After the Spanish American wars of independence, Bolivia claimed Antofagasta as part of its territory. Despite having an overwhelmingly ethnic Chilean population, Chile recognised Bolivian sovereignty of Antofagasta in 1866, but in 1879 Chile recanted its recognition of Bolivian sovereignty citing a Bolivian breach of the latest boundary treaty. Antofagasta was captured by Chile on February 14, 1879, triggering the War of the Pacific (1879–83). Chilean sovereignty was officially recognised by Bolivia under the terms of the 1904 Treaty of Peace and Friendship.

The city of Antofagasta is closely linked to mining activity, being a port and the chief service hub for one of Chile's major mining areas. While silver and saltpeter mining have been historically important for Antofagasta, since the mid-19th century copper mining is by far the most important mining activity for Antofagasta fueling a steady growth in the areas of construction, retail, hotel accommodations, population growth, and a remarkable skyline development until the end of the 2000s commodities boom in 2013. Since the 2010s Antofagasta is also a service hub for lithium mining.

Antofagasta has the highest GDP per capita of Chile, US$37,000 and the 3rd place for Human Development Index just after Metropolitana de Santiago Region and Magallanes and Antártica Chilena Region.

History

Name 

Currently there are several theories to explain the origin of the name Antofagasta.  A clear consensus regarding the true origin of the word has not yet been determined.

However, it is said the name Antofagasta is due to a decision by Manuel Mariano Melgarejo, who renamed the city in honor of an  that he had in Antofagasta de la Sierra, in 1870.

Early settlers 

The territory of Antofagasta was included in maps of the Captaincy General of Chile in the 18th century, depending from the city of Copiapó.

Bolivia created the "Departamento del Litoral", during the government of Andrés de Santa Cruz, in 1837, which was divided into two provinces: La Mar (with capital Cobija) and Atacama (with its capital in San Pedro de Atacama) and 1868, Antofagasta would be the capital of the province of Mejillones. 

The territory was disputed between Chile and Bolivia until the signing of the Boundary Treaty of 1866.

On 18 September 1866, José Santos Ossa and Francisco Puelma achieved the award of the concession of nitrate lands, following a request taken to the Bolivian government. The exploring of the Chilean miners found rich deposits of saltpeter (nitratine) in the field of Salar del Carmen, to the east of the present Antofagasta. Agreed to form the "Sociedad Exploradora del Desierto de Atacama" (Explorer Society of Atacama Desert). After the formation of the company, began to fill with what was called "La Chimba". On 19 March 1868, the "Melbourne Clark Company" was established, after the integration of Chilean and British capital. 

After the tsunami in Iquique and the 1868 Arica earthquake, it was necessary to give legal recognition to the Chimba as a mining town. On 27 August 1868, Bolivia's President Mariano Melgarejo instructed the Prefect of the Department of Litoral, the official founding of La Chimba, in the area bounded by the commissioners and Jose Santos Hilario Ruiz Prada.  On 22 October 1868, the population was officially established and the port under the name La Chimba, as stated in the foundation charter. Later the city was renamed Antofagasta. The first official map of the population and the port of Antofagasta was designed by Jose Santos Prada on 14 September 1869. This document set out the grounds of the Melbourne Clark Company, plus 17 blocks and the Main Square. 

On 8 May 1872, Antofagasta was designated by the Bolivian Government as Puerto Mayor, opening trade worldwide. Next year, on 25 January 1872, following a session led by the prefect of the Provincial Department of Mejillones, Manuel Buitrago founded the Municipality of Antofagasta under Bolivian Law of Municipalities, which formed the body of "Municipal Agents", composed of two Germans, one Englishman and six Chileans.

On 27 November 1873, the "Compañía de Salitres y Ferrocarril de Antofagasta" (CSFA), a Chilean mining company, signed a contract with the government of Bolivia, in which taxes were removed from mineral exploitation for 15 years. This contract was not ratified by the Congress of Bolivia, which was then analyzed negotiations with Chile.

War of the Pacific 

In 1873 Bolivia signed a secret treaty of defensive alliance with Peru. This would be used as an argument 5 years later in Chile, when it unleashed the War of the Pacific. The secret alliance forbade Bolivia from signing a border treaty with Chile, without consulting with Peru. However, in 1874 Chile and Bolivia signed a border treaty, which replaced the previous treaty of 1866. One of its points was not to impose new taxes on individuals, industries and Chilean capital for 25 years.

For Bolivia, the contract of 1873 between the government and CSFA was not yet in force, because, according to the Bolivian constitution, all contracts with the Bolivian government had to be approved by the congress.

According to the Bolivian version of events, the contract with the saltpeter company was incomplete so the congress, to approve the contract, decided to enforce a tax of 10 cents, which did not violate the treaty of 1874, since the contract was not yet in force at that date. Bolivia suspended the tax in deference to the government of Chile, but following a note from the Chilean foreign minister, it reactivated the tax law, then cancelled and closed the "Compañía de Salitres". Faced with a looming conflict with Chile, Bolivia decided to claim support under the agreement signed with Peru, and the treaty became effective with the Chilean occupation of Antofagasta, on 14 February 1879.

According to the Chilean version of events, the tax of 10 cents violated the treaty of 1874 since according to this, new taxes should not have been imposed on Chilean companies operating in Bolivia. At the breaking of the boundary treaty by Bolivia, and the cancellation of the contract of the CSFA, Chile seized Antofagasta, then in Bolivian territory, whose sovereignty had been ratified before 1866. After the war, a pact of truce was signed between Bolivia and Chile in 1884, which stated that the territory between the Loa River and parallel 23 would be under the administration of Chile, while Bolivia would be allowed access to the ports of Arica and Antofagasta. However, both treaties left outstanding issues to be clarified in two subsequent treaties, the Treaty of Peace and Friendship between Chile and Bolivia in 1904 and the 1929 Treaty of Lima in Peru.

20th century 

The Treaty of Peace and Friendship between Chile and Bolivia, signed on 20 October 1904, and promulgated on 21 March 1905, established in perpetuity border between Chile and Bolivia. The territory of Antofagasta was definitely within Chile's borders but in return Chile agreed to build a railroad that would link the cities of Arica and La Paz, Bolivia was granted free movement of commerce through Chilean territory. 

In 1905, the city of Antofagasta began construction of sewers, because of existing outbreaks of bubonic plague and smallpox. The same year was ordered, so unsatisfactory, the closure of public places, in order to prevent the spread of disease. 

On 1 February 1906, the railway workers union of the "Ferrocarril de Antofagasta a Bolivia" called for a readjustment of working hours, which was rejected. For this reason, on 6 February, from more than 3,000 workers went on strike, marching in protest to the Plaza Colon (main square). The army opened fire on protesters, killing 58 people. The event is known as the "Massacre of Plaza Colon". 

In 1912, the British community (La Colonia Britanica) erected a clock tower, replicating Big Ben, in Plaza Colón to celebrate the republic's centenary.

In 1937, the Municipality of Antofagasta made a national call for the composition of Antofagasta's anthem. Antonio Rendic, famous physician and poet of the city, and Juan Bautista Quagliotto, musician, claimed the right to compose the lyrics and music, respectively. On 2 February 1948, the Mayor Juan de Dios Carmona proposed in an open session in the hall of the Municipality, the establishment of 14 February as the day of the celebration of Antofagasta, despite not being the real founding date. Later, after the popular approval, the council approved the date.

In 1956 the Universidad del Norte (now the Catholic University of the North) was founded, due to support from the Catholic University of Valparaíso. On 9 October, of the same year began the negotiations for the creation of the "Centro Universitario Zona Norte" (University Center North Zone), part of the University of Chile. In 1968 the Antofagasta center of the University of Chile was inaugurated, after a university reform agreement which meant the autonomy of the University Center North Zone. Finally in 1981, merging the offices of the University of Chile and Technical State University, giving rise to the University of Antofagasta.

On 18 June 1991, a mudslide devastated much of the city, undermining land, damaged 2,464 houses and destroyed 493 buildings. Material damage was estimated at $70,000,000. The disaster left 92 dead, 16 missing and about 20,000 homeless. On 30 July 1995, the city was hit by an earthquake measuring 7.3 on the Richter Scale, with an intensity VII to VIII on the Mercalli Scale. Although it took a toll of three deaths and a hundred injuries, structural damage was minor for the magnitude of the event.

2000 – present

The construction industry has had remarkable growth as seen in the many recently constructed tall buildings, the extension of the urban area to the north of the city, and different urban projects as the renovation of the entire Costanera Avenue, and walkways of the city center. In economic development, settled many retail chains and supermarkets as well as various high-quality hotel chains, which promoted business tourism to attract capital and trading partners in mining and port activity.  Similarly, the city was awarded the installation of the Casino Enjoy Antofagasta.

In the municipal elections of 2008, the first female mayor of the city, Dra. Marcela Hernando, was elected, who retired from her political party to run as an independent. This allowed her to have diverse support from all sectors of the population of Antofagasta.

Experts estimated in 2010 that by 2020 the city would reach a population of 500,000.

Geography 

The urban area of Antofagasta begins abruptly, breaking the monotony of the desert and is located in the coastal plains, south of Mejillones Peninsula and north of "Cerro Coloso". The Tropic of Capricorn passes in the north of the city, outside the urban area, which is located the Cerro Moreno International Airport. The Tropic of Capricorn Monument was opened on 21 December 2000 in celebration of this. Designed by the architect Eleonora Roman, it was created to point the Tropic of Capricorn and to work as a Solar Calendar.

Antofagasta was declared a partial common in the border area 20 July 1999, by Supreme Decree No. 1166 of the Ministry of Foreign Affairs.

The city has little vegetation because it is situated in the Atacama Desert, which is the world's driest desert.

Climate 

The town of Antofagasta has a cold desert climate (Köppen BWk) with abundant sunshine and strong maritime influence.

The marked aridity and water scarcity are regulated by the Humboldt Current, addition to the high humidity and morning fog known as "Camanchaca". Furthermore, the Pacific anticyclone generates winds from the south and southwest.

However, the sporadic occurrence of heavy rainfall, together with the geomorphologic situation of the city, make it susceptible to be affected by mud flows and landslides. Between 1916 and 1999, the city was affected by floods or landslides on seven occasions: 1925, 1930, twice in 1940, 1982, 1987 and 1991, of which the most important episodes in 1940 and 1991.

Geomorphology 

Antofagasta is grounded on rocky ground, hard and tough. Over this layer is a dense soil with sand and medium-sized rock fragments where there are remains of abundant minerals. According to the general classification of soils, Antofagasta is founded on clay loam soils of the type I and II.

The city has an irregular geomorphology by the presence of steep hills (400–500 m) that are part of Chilean Coast Range, in its eastern edge, and the Pacific Ocean to the west. The formation of the rock mass, it makes the shoreline slope is very steep (Coloso, south of Antofagasta). The coastal edge of the city has volcanic sediments, in contrast to the formation of hills of sand. Stresses in the sea a rock formation called La Portada.

Among the most important mountains of the geography of the town of Antofagasta is the Cerro El Ancla (1.007 m), el Cerro Chato (485 m), Cerro Moño (4.830 m), Cerro Coloso (938 m), Cerro Bolfín (961 m), Cerro Jarón (988 m), Cerro Alcalde Poblete (979 m), Cerro Gordo (668 m), Cerro Fortuna (963 m) and Cerro Moreno (1.290 m).
In the coastal area, the commune has two portions island called Isla Guamán (located in front of Caleta La Chimba, 23°33'00"S latitude and 70°25'00"W longitude) and Isla Santa María (located in front of Caleta Constitución, 23°26'00"S latitude and 70°37'00"W longitude).

Hydrology 

There are about fifteen streams that have watersheds with accumulation of sand and gravel. Within the broader watershed (hoya) are the "Hoya La Chimba", "Hoya Caracoles", "Hoya La Cadena", "Hoya La Negra" and "Hoya El Way". These watersheds and their streams (Quebrada), such as "Quebrada sin nombre", "Quebrada Baquedano", "Quebrada El Toro", "Quebrada El Carrizo" and "Quebrada Jardines del Sur", which helped cause the flood of 1991. 

The coastal edge of Antofagasta is rocky and steep, so there are no natural beaches, the majority being artificial. Just north of the city, natural beaches extend to the areas of "La Portada", "Las Losetas" and "La Rinconada".

Within the water resources of the commune, there are different dry lakes (salar), among which include the Salar de Pajonales, Salar Mar Muerto, Salar Punta Negra and the Salar de Navidad.

Governance 

As a commune, Antofagasta is a third-level administrative division of Chile administered by a municipal council, headed by an alcalde who is directly elected every four years. As of 2021, the mayor is Jonathan Velásquez.

Within the electoral divisions of Chile, Antofagasta is represented in the Chamber of Deputies by Marcela Hernando (PRSD) and Paulina Nuñez (RN) as part of the 4th electoral district, together with Mejillones, Sierra Gorda and Taltal. The commune is represented in the Senate by Pedro Araya (Progressive Convergence, 2014–2022) and Alejandro Guillier (Progressive Convergence, 2014–2022) as part of the 2nd senatorial constituency (Antofagasta Region).

The township has three local police courts. In addition, the Municipality of Antofagasta has a number of municipal headquarters, which are entities created to meet and control certain community needs a more specific way.

Economy 

Antofagasta's economic development is mainly based on copper mining and nonmetallic minerals such as nitrate and iodine. It is also important port activity, although in recent years has lost the lead port in the region, due to the installation of the megaport of Mejillones. 

Antofagasta owns two major industrial areas; one is located  outside the urban area known as Ciudad Empresarial La Negra, a complex of approximately 2,400 hectares.  There are refinery furnace copper industries in addition to cement, lime and other products. The second industrial area is located in the north of the city, where they have installed multiple operating centers of different companies, mainly along the "Pedro Aguirre Cerda Avenue."

Trade is concentrated mainly in the center of Antofagasta, around the Plaza Colón, where there are installed within the last 2 decades several national retail chains. Moreover, in different parts of the city have set up large supermarket chains like "Líder", "Tottus", "Unimarc", "Santa Isabel" and "Jumbo".

Recently in 2006, were also installed, the national chain " Mall Plaza" in the coastal area and the "Casino Enjoy Antofagasta" in the south of the city.

Business Tourism 

Because of the important administrative position of Antofagasta in the region, the historical relationship with the mining sector, and the production of the 54% of copper at the national level. 

Events are held annually with the assistance of several mining countries of the world, and one of the most important is "EXPONOR" organized by the "Asociación de Industriales Antofagasta", guild formed by the major copper producers in the region. Exponor is a show that promotes the gestation of chains, new business and exchanging knowledge and experiences among entrepreneurs from different countries of the world. This important trade fair generated a portfolio of U.S. $41,291 million (63.48% world total), for the period 2007–2015.

Cost of living 
This city is considered the most expensive to live in Chile, next to Santiago and Punta Arenas.

Demographics 

In the commune, 295,792 (99.6%) lived in urban areas and 1,113 (0.4%) in rural areas. The population grew by 30.0% (68,497 persons) between the 1992 and 2002 censuses. A 2009 population projection by the National Institute of Statistics of Chile says the city has an estimated population of 360,473 inhabitants. Experts have estimated that in the next 10 years the city will reach 500,000 inhabitants.

Education 

The city has several public and private educational universities. Two major traditional universities, one that is public, University of Antofagasta, and other private, Catholic University of the North. Several private autonomous universities have been open since 2002. Previously, the now-defunct "University José Santos Ossa" was the only private autonomous university in Antofagasta.

Although the public schools are distributed almost uniformly throughout the city, the private schools operate mainly in the central and southern part of the city, where the wealthiest inhabitants reside. Only three private schools in the city are ranked among the top 100 schools in the country with the highest scores in the University Selection Test, which are The Antofagasta British School, "Hrvatska Skola San Esteban" and "Antofagasta International School".

Antofagasta is the first city in Chile which has a municipal school operating within a military compound: "Recovery Center for Integrative Studies in Military Training", located within the Reinforced Regiment No. 20 "La Concepción".

Sport

Football 
In Antofagasta, the most popular sport is association football. The football club Deportes Antofagasta is part of the Chilean First Division A (although it played two periods in the First División of Professional Football), and plays its home matches at Antofagasta Regional Stadium. Other football clubs of the city are the Club Deportivo Ormazábal and Club Deportivo Unión Bellavista which play in the Third Division A of Chile.

Other sports 
Antofagasta was one of the host cities of the official 1959 Basketball World Cup, where Chile won the bronze medal.

In baseball, different teams are formed and maintained in competition since the last century, and the selection of the city dispute the national classic game with the selection of Tocopilla (historically the best team of baseball in Chile).

Transportation

Routes and avenues 
The main land route connectivity in the province is Route 5-CH, which connects the city with the rest of the country and is part of the Panamerican Highway. This route connects to the city by Route CH-26 in the north of the city, and Route CH-28 to the south. In addition, the city is connected to the north of the country by Route 1-CH, a way that also allows access to Andrés Sabella Gálvez International Airport and the natural monument La Portada.

Vehicular traffic is concentrated around the main avenues of the city due to the long and narrow shape of the urban area. The only avenue that crosses the city from north to south, corresponds to the coastal route known as Avenida Costanera, which is formed by the avenues Jaime Guzmán, Ejército, República de Croacia, Grecia, José Manuel Balmaceda, Aníbal Pinto, 7º de Línea and Edmundo Pérez Zujovic; these avenues provide access to places including Mall Plaza Antofagasta, the Campus Coloso of the University of Antofagasta, the city hall of the Municipality of Antofagasta.

Airport and port 
Andrés Sabella Gálvez International Airport is the only airport in Antofagasta and is located in Cerro Moreno, north of the city. This site, despite being classified as International Airport, operates mostly as a terminal for national flights, with one international airline, LATAM Peru, flying to Lima. In this terminal three domestic airlines also operate, LATAM Chile, Principal Airlines and Sky Airlines.

The city has a port complex of seven docks, inaugurated by President Carlos Ibáñez del Campo on 14 February 1943 under the name of Puerto de Antofagasta, which consists of two terminals. Terminal 1, consists of the docks 1, 2 and 3, is multi-operator and is managed by the "Empresa Portuaria Antofagasta" (EPA) since 1 July 1998. Terminal No. 2, composed of docks 4, 5, 6 and 7, monooperario type, which is managed and operated by the company "Antofagasta Terminal Internacional" (ATI) since 1 March 2003. Overall, this tourist (member of the Association of Cruise Ports Southern Cone) and commercial port, can operate the production of 5,000,000 tons of cargo.

Escondida, the biggest private mining company in Chile, has a private port located in southern city, near Cerro Coloso.

Public transport 

The higher transportation consists of thirteen lines of minibuses, which correspond to buses with a capacity of fewer than thirty people. The public transport is within a tender and is known as TransAntofagasta. The public transport plan took effect officially on 28 November 2005, replacing the old bus service. The route of these buses finish in the Caleta Coloso (south end of the city) during the year, and during the summer come as far as Balneario Juan Lopez, which is out of town.

The lower transport consists of taxis lines, corresponding to a black sedans that make their way through the urban area through fixed routes.

Railways 
The most important railroad is the Ferrocarril de Antofagasta a Bolivia (FCAB) founded in 1888, during the economic boom of the saltpeter industry. In 1930, FCAB was acquired by Antofagasta PLC, which is part of the Quiñenco commercial group.

Unlike other contemporary mining railways, FCAB survived the crash of the natural nitrate sector.

Future commuter rail 
Due to the accelerated urban and demographic growth of Antofagasta during 2000–2010, a commuter train using the current FCAB line is currently under review.  The project aims to decongest vehicle traffic by linking the north and south of the city with a direct train line.

Twin towns – sister cities

Antofagasta is twinned with:
 Ambato, Tungurahua, Ecuador
 Split, Split-Dalmatia, Croatia
 Tongling, Anhui, China
 Volos, Thessaly, Greece

See also
2007 Tocopilla earthquake

References

External links

 Municipality of Antofagasta
 EXPONOR – The most important trade fair of copper mining in the world.

 
Communes of Chile
Port cities in Chile
Capitals of Chilean regions
Capitals of Chilean provinces
Populated places established in 1868
Metropolitan areas of Chile
Populated places in Antofagasta Province
1868 establishments in Chile
Coasts of Antofagasta Region